Yakov Veniaminovich Gorelnikov (8 September 1947 – 18 September 2022) was a Kazakh actor and politician. An independent, he served on the Supreme Council of Kazakhstan from 1994 to 1995.

Gorelnikov died in Semey on 18 September 2022, at the age of 75.

References

1947 births
2022 deaths
20th-century Kazakhstani politicians
Soviet actors
Kazakhstani actors
Soviet theatre directors
Political office-holders in Kazakhstan
People from Semey